"Natural Science" is a song by the Canadian rock band Rush. It was released on their 1980 album Permanent Waves, as the final song on it.  It is over nine minutes long and is composed of three distinct movements: I) Tide Pools, II) Hyperspace, and III) Permanent Waves.

Background
Guitarist Alex Lifeson said:  Once we had the guitar track down, we stuck a speaker cabinet outside—this was up at the studio in Morin Heights, Quebec—and we recorded the natural echo off the mountains in combination with the sound of splashing water and Geddy's voice. We didn't use any sort of synthetic echo on the water track.

Parts

References

Further reading

Rush (band) songs
Songs written by Alex Lifeson
Songs written by Geddy Lee
Songs written by Neil Peart
Song recordings produced by Terry Brown (record producer)
Mercury Records singles
1980 songs